Mbale Regional Referral Hospital, commonly known as Mbale Hospital is a hospital in Mbale, Eastern Uganda. It is the referral hospital for the districts of Busia, Budaka, Kibuku, Kapchorwa, Bukwa, Butaleja, Manafwa, Mbale, Pallisa, Sironko and Tororo. The hospital also serves many more patients from outside the hospital's catchment area.

Location

The coordinates of Mbale Regional Referral Hospital are: 01°04'36.0"N, 34°10'35.0"E (Latitude:1.076667; Longitude:34.176389).

Overview
Mbale Hospital is a public hospital, funded by the Uganda Ministry of Health and general care in the hospital is free. The hospital is one of the thirteen "Regional Referral Hospitals" in Uganda. It is also designated as one of the three public clinical paramedical teaching hospitals and as one of the fifteen "Internship Hospitals" in Uganda, where graduates of Ugandan medical schools can serve a one-year internship under the supervision of qualified specialists and consultants. The hospital is the teaching hospital of Busitema University School of Medicine.

See also

References

External links
 About Mbale Hospital
 Photo of Pediatric Ward in Mbale Hospital

Hospitals in Uganda
 
Mbale District
Bugisu sub-region
Eastern Region, Uganda
Teaching hospitals in Uganda
1920s establishments in Uganda